The Indian state of Rajasthan  is divided into 33 districts and they are further divided into more than 370 Tehsils. Some of tehsils around 30, are announced by the Government which are not fully functioning as tehsils at the moment.

As an entity of local government, the tehsil office (panchayat samiti) exercises certain fiscal and administrative power over the villages and municipalities within its jurisdiction. It is the ultimate executive agency for land records and related administrative matters. The chief official is called the tehsildar. Tehsils can be considered sub-districts in the Indian context. In some instances, tehsils overlap with "blocks" (panchayat union blocks or panchayat development blocks) and come under the land and revenue department, headed by tehsildar; and blocks come under the rural development department, headed by the block development officer and serve different government administrative functions over the same or similar geographical area.

List 
List of Tehsils in Rajasthan state are as follows

References 

 
Tehsils
Rajasthan